Liu Yin (劉胤) (died 329), courtesy name Yisun (義孫), was an imperial prince of the Chinese/Xiongnu state Han Zhao, who, following his father Liu Yao's capture by rival Later Zhao, tried to maintain the state with his brother, the crown prince Liu Xi, but was unsuccessful and killed by Later Zhao.

Liu Yin was Liu Yao's son by his probable first wife, Princess Bu, while he was still the Prince of Qin.  He had an older brother, Liu Jian (劉儉).  When Liu Jian was nine and Liu Yin was four, the emperor Liu Cong saw them, and was very impressed by Liu Yin.  He told Liu Yao to make Liu Yin his heir.  Liu Yao responded that he was just an imperial prince and should not reverse the proper order of heirship.  Liu Cong instead told him that due to his contributions to Han Zhao, he was unlike other princes, and that he should make Liu Yin, who he felt was more talented, the heir.  He therefore created Liu Jian the Prince of Linhai and created Liu Yin as the heir to Liu Yao.  As Liu Yin grew up, he became strong and skillful at horsemanship and archery, and was so quick in his reaction that he was compared to a whirlwind.

When Liu Cong's successor Liu Can was overthrown by Jin Zhun in 318, Jin massacred members of the Liu clan in the capital Pingyang (平陽, in modern Linfen, Shanxi).  Liu Yin's grandmother Lady Hu and his uncle lost their lives, but Liu Yin fled.  However, he was captured by or sold to the Heiniyuju (黑匿郁鞠) tribe as a slave.  After Liu Yao defeated the renegade general Chen An in 323, Liu Yin revealed his identity to the chief, who was surprised and respectfully deliver Liu Yin back to Liu Yao.  (It is not clear where Heiniyuju was or why Liu Yin waited until Chen's defeat to reveal his identity to the chief; it could have been that Heiniyuju was initially a Chen ally, and while Chen was, prior to his rebellion, nominally a Han Zhao general, Liu Yin might have been concerned about being detained by Chen as a bargaining chip.)  By this time, Liu Yao, who had assumed that Liu Yin was dead, had created his younger son Liu Xi crown prince.  He considered replacing Liu Xi with Liu Yin, since Liu Yin was the original heir, and he considered Liu Yin general material.  However, after opposition by Liu Yin's uncle Bu Tai (卜泰) and another official Han Guang (韓廣), Liu Yin personally declined to replace Liu Xi, instead stating that he could use his abilities to assist Liu Xi.  Liu Yao agreed, and he let Liu Xi remain crown prince, while granting Liu Yin special honors, including requiring Liu Xi to yield to Liu Yin as an older brother in ceremonies, rather than for Liu Yin to yield to Liu Xi as the crown prince. The relationship between the brothers appeared to remain cordial until their deaths.  He also posthumously honored Liu Yin's mother, Princess Bu, as Empress Yuandao.

In 325, Liu Yao created Liu Yin the Prince of Nanyang and further bestowed the title of Grand Chanyu, putting Wu Hu tribal forces under his command.

In 327, believing that Han Zhao had been weakened by its defeat at Later Zhao's hands, Zhang Jun, the head of Former Liang, which had submitted to Han Zhao's suzerainty in 323, declared himself again a Jin vassal and pillaged Han Zhao's Qin Province (秦州, modern eastern Gansu). Liu Yin led an army and defeated Former Liang's forces, even crossing the Yellow River, but eventually settling for capturing Former Liang's remaining territory east of the Yellow River.

Around the new year of 329, Liu Yao was captured in battle by Later Zhao forces. Liu Xi became effectively acting emperor, and after consulting with Liu Yin, he decided to withdraw from the capital Chang'an west to Shanggui (上邽, in modern Tianshui, Gansu), the capital of the mountainous Qin Province, considered more easily defensible. However, the withdrawal caused a panic, and all Han Zhao generals abandoned their positions and fled to Qin Province as well, easily yielding most of remaining Han Zhao territory to Later Zhao.

In fall 329, Han Zhao forces, under Liu Yin's command, tried to recapture Chang'an. Initially, he had some successes and recaptured much of the territory lost to Later Zhao. However, as he besieged Chang'an, the Later Zhao general Shi Hu arrived and defeated him. Liu Yin retreated toward Shanggui, and Shi Hu trailed him and defeated him again, capturing Shanggui. He killed Liu Xi, Liu Yin, along with all Han Zhao princes and high level officials and generals. He forcibly relocated all other officials and the large clans of Qin and Yong (雍州, modern central and northern Shaanxi) Provinces to the Later Zhao capital Xiangguo (襄國, in modern Xintai, Hebei), and massacred, in Luoyang, the members of the Xiongnu nobility. Han Zhao came to an end.

Former Zhao generals
Former Zhao imperial princes
329 deaths
Year of birth unknown
Executed Former Zhao people
People executed by Later Zhao